Balter, Guth, Aloni & Co. ("BGA") is an Israeli law firm.

History
Balter, Guth, Aloni & Co. was founded in 1974. The firm has offices in Tel Aviv, Jerusalem, Haifa, Tiberias and Beer Sheva.

BGA is a member of Consulegis, an international network of law firms. It holds a cooperation agreement with the U.S law firm of Herzfeld & Rubin.

References

External links
 Balter, Guth, Aloni & Co. Profile, BDI Code- 2005 (PDF file)

Law firms established in 1974
Law firms of Israel
1974 establishments in Israel